Anthony Onyemaechi Elumelu   (born 22 March 1963) is a Nigerian economist, and philanthropist. He chairs Heirs Holdings, Transcorp and is the founder of The Tony Elumelu Foundation. 

In 2020, Elumelu was named on Times list of the 100 most influential people in the world.

Early life

Childhood and family
Elumelu was born in Jos, Plateau, Nigeria, on 22 March 1963, to Suzanne and Dominic Elumelu from Onicha-Ukwu in Aniocha North Local Government Area of Delta State.   He grew up with four siblings, one of whom is Ndudi Elumelu, a minority leader in the Nigerian Federal House of Representatives.

Education
He studied Economics at Bendel State University (now Ambrose Alli University)  obtaining a Bachelor of Science. Afterward, he studies and received a Master of Science degree in Economics at the University of Lagos.

Career

Early career
Elumelu worked in the Nigerian Bank Union Bank as a Youth Corp member during his National Youth Service Corps in 1985, before starting his career as a salesman. Elumelu subsequently joined Allstates Trust Bank. in 2005 and United Bank for Africa (UBA) was acquired afterwards.

On his early career, he has said: I started my career as a salesman, a copier salesman to be specific, young, hungry, and hardworking, but the reality was that I was just one of the thousands of young Nigerian graduates, all eager to succeed.

In 1997, Elumelu led a small group of investors to take over a struggling Crystal Bank (later renamed Standard Trust Bank). He turned it profitable within a few years and in 2005 he led one of the largest mergers in the banking sector in Sub-Saharan Africa by acquiring United Bank for Africa (UBA).

United Bank for Africa
Following the merger of Standard Trust Bank and United Bank for Africa in 2005, Elumelu led the company as Group Managing Director from a single-country banking group to a pan-African bank with subsidiaries in 20 African countries, France, the U.S and the U.K, eventually stepping down in 2010. 

Elumelu currently chairs the board of the United Bank for Africa

Heirs Holdings
In 2010, he founded Heirs Holdings, his family-owned investment holding company. Elumelu also established in the same year the Tony Elumelu Foundation, an Africa-based foundation championing entrepreneurship in Africa.
Heirs Holdings maintains a portfolio of investments across several sectors. Through Heirs Holdings, Elumelu holds a controlling interest in Transnational Corporation, a diversified conglomerate with business interests in Power, Hospitality and Energy

Transcorp Plc 
On April 14th 2021, Elumelu was officially handed the Certificate of Discharge of the iconic hospitality facility. The National Council on Privatization (NCP), which is chaired by the Vice President of Nigeria Prof. Yemi Osinbajo, handed over full ownership of Transcorp Hotels to the Chairman after fulfilling all privatization conditions attached to the sale of the property in 2005.

Philanthropy

The Tony Elumelu Foundation

Following his retirement from United Bank for Africa in 2010, Elumelu founded The Tony Elumelu Foundation.
The Tony Elumelu Foundation promotes entrepreneurship in Africa. The Tony Elumelu Foundation’s belief that the private sector’s role is critical for Africa’s development is hinged on the economic philosophy of Africapitalism, which was introduced by Elumelu; "that the African private sector has the power to transform the continent through long-term investments, creating both economic prosperity and social wealth."

In 2015, Elumelu committed $100 million to create 10,000 entrepreneurs across Africa over the next 10 years through the Tony Elumelu Foundation Entrepreneurship Programme - a Pan-African entrepreneurship initiative designed to empower African entrepreneurs through a multi-year programme of training, funding, and mentoring.

Awards and honours
Elumelu has received recognition and praise for his contributions to business and entrepreneurship.
In 2003, the Federal Government of Nigeria granted Elumelu the title of Member of the Order of the Federal Republic , a national honour.
In 2012, he was awarded the National Honour of Commander of the Order of the Niger  for his service in promoting private enterprise.
He was awarded the Daily Times, Nigerian man of the year in 2016.
In 2018 and 2019 he was awarded the All-Africa Business Leaders Awards (AABLA) Philanthropist of the Year Award
Bayero University Kano (BUK) - Honorary Doctor of Business degree in 2019
He was honored with the National Productivity Order of Merit Award in 2019.
 TIME magazine's 100 Most Influential People of 2020.
On 11 October 2022, Elumelu received the National honour of Commander of the Order of the Federal Republic.

Personal life
Elumelu married Awele Vivien Elumelu, a medical doctor, in 1993. They have seven children together.

References

1963 births
Living people
People from Jos
Nigerian economists
Nigerian bankers
Nigerian philanthropists
Ambrose Alli University alumni
Nigerian chairpersons of corporations
University of Lagos alumni
Members of the Order of the Federal Republic